Visvanatha Siva Temple is a Hindu temple dedicated to Visvanatha and is one of the temples of Bhubaneswar, a revered pilgrimage center and the capital of the state of Orissa, India. It is a living temple, facing west, situated on the road from Lingaraja Temple to Mausima Temple. The presiding deity is a Siva lingam with a circular yoni installed inside the sanctum that was brought from Kasi. The temple was built in the 19th century and is of modern construction.

Name 

i) Present Name: Visvanatha Siva Temple-II

ii) Past Name:

Location 

Lat.  200, 14’35" N.,

Long. 850, 50’ 04"E.,

Elev. 86 ft

Ownership 

i) Single/ Multiple: Multiple.

ii) Public/ Private: Public.

iii) Any other (specify): The temple is now under the Lingaraja temple administration. But renovation works were carried out by Ghanasyama Garabadu.

Age 

i) Approximate date: 19th Century A.D.

ii) Source of Information: Local information.

Property Type 

i) Precinct/ Building/ Structure/Landscape/Site/Tank: Building

ii) Subtype: Temple.

iii) Typology: Vimana is a rekha deul and jagamohana is a pidha deul.

Property use 

i) Abandoned/ in use: In use.

ii) Present use: Living temple

iii) Past use: Worshipped

Significance 

i) Historic significance: —

ii) Cultural significance: Various religious sacraments like Sankranti, Chatturdasi and Jalabhisekha are performed.

iii) Social significance: Rituals like  Rudrabhisekha, Rudrasthami  and Mahamritunjaya are also performed.

iv) Associational significance:—

Physical description 

i) Surrounding: The temple is surrounded by the Lingaraja temple compound wall in the north at a distance of 6.75 metres, Dolagovinda temple in south, Rosasala (kitchen house) in west and the leading road to the northern entrance of Lingaraja temple in west.

ii) Orientation: The temple is facing towards west.

iii) Architectural features (Plan and Elevation):  On plan, the temple has a Vimana and Jagamohana of modern construction measuring 6.65 metres in length and 2.90 metres in width. The sanctum measures 2.80 square metres and jagamohana 2.90 square metres. With threefold division of the bada the temple has a  trianga bada measuring 1.90 metres. At the base pabhaga has a set of five mouldings of khura, kumbha, pata, kani and basanta that measures 0.64 metres. Jangha is plain measuring 0.84 metres in height, baranda measures 0.42 metres. Gandi measures 2.45 metres and is devoid of decoration.  mastaka conforms to the typical Kalingan style that measures 1.30 metres in height.

iv) Raha niche & parsva devatas:  The  raha niches on the three sides uniformly measures 0.40 metres in height x 0.25 metres in width and 0.17 metres in depth. All are empty.

v) Decorative features:

Doorjambs: The doorjamb is  plain

Lintel:     —

vi) Building material: The monument is covered with modern cement plaster.

vii) Construction techniques: Dry masonry

viii) Style: Kalingan

ix) Special features, if any: —

State of preservation 

i) Good/Fair/ Showing Signs of Deterioration/Advanced: Fair

ii) State of Decay/Danger of Disappearance:

Condition description 

i) Signs of distress: —

ii) Structural problems: —

iii) Repairs and Maintenance: The temple was repaired and maintained by Ghanasyama Garabadu of Badu Sahi, Old Town and Bhubaneswar.

Grade (A/B/C) 

i) Architecture: C

ii) Historic: C

iii) Associational: C

iv) Social/Cultural:B

v) Others:

Threats to the property 

Conservation Problem and Remedies: —-
Compound Wall: There is a compound wall made of laterite and with the entrance in the western side, the northern compound wall of the Lingaraja served the southern compound wall of the temple.

See also

 List of Hindu Temples in Orissa

References 

Shiva temples in Odisha
Hindu temples in Bhubaneswar
19th-century Hindu temples